Cayden Boyd (born May 24, 1994) is an American actor. He is best known for his child roles as Max in Robert Rodriguez's 2005 film The Adventures of Sharkboy and Lavagirl and Ben Reynolds in the 2007 film Have Dreams, Will Travel.

Life

Boyd was born in Bedford, Texas. His older sister, Jenna, is also an actor. Boyd plays violin and cello and played high school football at Village Christian School. He graduated from Pepperdine University in 2016, studying business.

Career
Boyd landed his first roles, small television roles and commercials, as young as 6 and 7. He played Tim Robbins's son in Mystic River. In 2004, he was cast in the starring role of Max in the 2005 film The Adventures of Sharkboy and Lavagirl. He played young Warren Worthington III in X-Men: The Last Stand, and he was cast in the lead role in the 2007 film Have Dreams, Will Travel (originally titled A West Texas Children’s Story). He appeared on episodes of such television series as Crossing Jordan, Cold Case, Close to Home and Scrubs. In 2008, he appeared alongside Julia Roberts and Willem Dafoe in Fireflies in the Garden. In 2015 Boyd also had a role on the television series Awkward playing Jenna's Marine boyfriend.

Filmography

Film

Television

Awards and nominations

References

External links

American male child actors
American male film actors
American male television actors
Living people
Male actors from Texas
People from Bedford, Texas
1994 births
21st-century American male actors
American male voice actors
Pepperdine University alumni